The recorded history of the rulers of Lahore (Punjabi: ,), covers thousands of years. Originally the capital and largest city of the Punjab region, it has since its creation changed hands from Hindu, Buddhist, Greek, Muslim, Mughal, Afghan, Sikh and the British, thereby becoming the cultural capital and the heart of modern-day Pakistan. Lahore's history reaches antiquity as it has been controlled by vast empires throughout history including the Kabul Shahis, Ghaznavids, Delhi Sultanate, Mughals, etc. The rulers and governors have also been repeatedly changed as the empires seized the city from other hands.

Taank Kingdoms (early 7th century–8th century) 

The Taanks (Takkas) were people from a variety of clans forming a kingdom. The rulers of the kingdom are only known from sources of chronicles and minted coins. During this rule (630 AD), Lahore was said to have been visited by the Chinese pilgrim Hieun Tsang. He described it as a great Brahmin city.

Note: Not listed chronologically.

 Ratapat 
 Bahurpal 
 Sahajpal 
 Madanpal

Hindu Shahis (850–1026 CE) 

The first documentation of Lahore is recorded as early as 982 CE (in the book Hudud al-'Alam) taking place during the rule of the Hindu Shahis. Lahore was made the capital of the Hindu Shahi Kingdom in the year 1001. From 800–900 AD it was under Brahman rule.

 Vakkadeva (850 CE – ?)
 Kamalavarman
 Bhimadeva
 Jayapala (964 to 1001 CE)
 Anandapala (1001 to 1010 CE)
 Trilochanapala (1010 to 1021 CE)
 Bhimpala (1021 to 1026 CE)

Ghaznavids (977–1186 CE) 

In 975 AD, Sabuktigin invades Lahore and defeats Raja Jayapala. His son forms the Ghaznavid Empire after capturing the city in 1021 CE, marking the start of predominant Muslim rule in Lahore.

 Malik Ayaz (1021–1186 CE), first Muslim governor of Lahore under the rule of Sultans

Delhi Sultanate (1186–1215 CE) 

 Malik Ikhtyaruddin Qaraqash, during Lodi Dynasty

References

Lahore
Lists of rulers lists